The Henry H. Dearborn House, also known as the Seattle Dearborn House is a single family residence in the First Hill neighborhood of Seattle, Washington, United States. It was designed in 1904 by architect Henry Dozier, and building was completed in 1907 for Seattle real estate developer Henry H. Dearborn. It is listed on the National Register of Historic Places and as a Seattle Landmark by the Seattle Landmarks Preservation Board. As of 2021, the building is used as the headquarters of Historic Seattle.

The Dearborn house is two and a half stories in an American Foursquare style, with stucco exterior. The house has an enclosed veranda and an out building originally built as stables. In 1953 the house was converted to a medical office, and subsequently into office space.

References 

1900s architecture in the United States
National Register of Historic Places in Seattle
Houses in Seattle
Houses on the National Register of Historic Places in Washington (state)
First Hill, Seattle